The 1967–68 Ice hockey Bundesliga season was the 10th season of the Ice hockey Bundesliga, the top level of ice hockey in Germany. 10 teams participated in the league, and EV Fussen won the championship. Krefelder EV won the DEV-Pokal.

First round

West

South

Relegation round

West

South

3rd place
FC Bayern München - ESV Kaufbeuren 5:3

DEV-Pokal

Final round

References

External links
Season on hockeyarchives.info

Eishockey-Bundesliga seasons
German
Bund